New Burlington is a former town located in Chester Township in the northwestern corner of Clinton County, Ohio off Ohio State Route 380. The GNIS classifies it as a populated place. It was acquired by the United States federal government when Caesar Creek was dammed and a reservoir created in the 1970s.

History
New Burlington was laid out in 1833, and named after Burlington, North Carolina, the native home of a share of the first settlers. A post office called New Burlington was established in 1837, and remained in operation until 1971. New Burlington was a "station" on the Underground Railroad.

Gallery

References

Further reading
John Baskin. New Burlington:  The Life and Death of an American Village.  New York:  W. W. Norton, 1976.  

Geography of Clinton County, Ohio
Ghost towns in Ohio
Unincorporated communities in Ohio
1971 disestablishments in Ohio